Cato Howe was an enslaved African American Black Patriot spy and courier during the American Revolution. Cato's enslaver, Hercules Mulligan, gathered intelligence through his personal connections as well as clients at his New York City tailoring shop, and Cato carried the information on horseback to Continental Army officers and other revolutionaries, including Alexander Hamilton and George Washington, and often through British-held territory. Cato's messages are credited with likely saving Washington's life on two occasions. Other than his intelligence activities with Mulligan, little definite information about Cato is available, though an excavation of his home after the war provides historians with more information about his life after the war.

American Revolution
Because no correspondence with Mulligan's name or a recognized alias on it survives, a complete record of his and Cato's activities during the American Revolution cannot be compiled. An article in the Daughters of the American Revolution Magazine in 1985 stated: "Every estimate of the number of minorities who participated in the American Revolution has been deceptively low...." Cato is among those whose contributions have been mostly overlooked. Historian Paul R. Misencik has written that Cato was a "faithful accomplice" of Mulligan's.

Cato enlisted as a private in the 2nd Massachusetts Regiment under Colonel John Bailey in 1775, along with his owner, Hercules Mulligan. In 1778 he was granted his freedom in return for his service.

Culper Ring

While Cato and Mulligan operated mostly simultaneously with Washington and Benjamin Tallmadge's Culper Ring of American spies, their official affiliation with the group is disputed. Although Historian Alexander Rose has written that Mulligan and Cato began espionage activities within six weeks of Robert Townsend, alias "Samuel Culper, Jr.", sending his first intelligence letter, historian Stephen Knott writes that they began spying in late 1776 or early 1777, well before formation of the Culper Ring ring in 1778 and mostly independent of it.

Hessian plot

Cato facilitated a plot between Mulligan and Haym Salomon, a Patriot loyalist who had been released from British captivity under the condition that he work as a translator between the British and Hessian soldiers. The plot involved both collecting intelligence from and advertising Mulligan's tailoring business to the Hessian officers. Mulligan sent Cato to Salomon's shop with ads to translate into German and pass to the Hessians, and Cato returned with the translations and intelligence that Mulligan could report to Hamilton and Washington at Continental Army headquarters.

British troop movements
Since the British did not suspect an enslaved person would be acting as a messenger to George Washington, in April 1777, they allowed Cato to cross the Hudson River on a ferry, carrying packages containing intelligence about British General William Howe's activities and movements. Many of the soldiers were Mulligan's customers, and therefore knew Cato and let him both pass to New Jersey and return to New York with the packages, marked "H. Mulligan, clothier."

After the British abandoned Philadelphia and returned to New York City in the summer of 1778, activity again picked up in the restored British Army headquarters. William Cunningham, an Irish Tory who was serving as Provost Marshal of New York City, suspected Mulligan of espionage and was curious about Cato's trips from New York. He eventually questioned and jailed Cato, treating him cruelly, and interrogating him about Mulligan's activities and his own deliveries out of town. Cato would not talk.

Attempts on Washington
During the winter of 1779, a British officer came into Mulligan's New York tailor shop late in the evening looking for a watch coat. During the ensuing conversation, the officer shared a British plan to attack and capture Washington the following day. Cato was quickly dispatched to alert Washington, who moved his troops and thwarted the attack.

In 1780, Mulligan received intelligence from his brother Hugh, who worked for British army contractor Kortright and Company, that the British planned to intercept Washington in New London, Connecticut on his way to meet with General Rochambeau. Cato carried the message to Washington, who rerouted in such a way to distract the British from the French landing in Newport, Rhode Island.

He was discharged in 1783.

Post-war life 
After his service, Cato returned to Plymouth, Massachusetts. In 1792, the town of Plymouth issued a decree stating that whosoever could clear a particular patch of land within three year could claim it. Cato, joined by Prince Goodwin, Plato Turner, and Quamany, took up the challenge and established a small community on their new property, calling it Parting Ways or New Guinea. Cato lived out the rest of his days there with his first wife Althea, who died around 1820, and then his second wife, Lucy Prettison. Cato passed away in 1824 and is buried on the land that he owned in Plymouth.

In popular culture
The Culper Ring is depicted in the fictionalized AMC American Revolutionary War period drama Turn: Washington's Spies based on Alexander Rose's book Washington's Spies: The Story of America's First Spy Ring (2007). Mulligan and Cato are portrayed in the fourth and final season.

See also
 Culper Ring
 Intelligence in the American Revolutionary War
 Intelligence operations in the American Revolutionary War
 Hercules Mulligan

References

18th-century American slaves
African-American history of New York (state)
African-American people
American spies during the American Revolution
Black Patriots
New York (state) in the American Revolution
Place of birth missing
Year of birth missing
Year of death missing